Salix gilgiana is a species of willow native to Japan and Korea. It is a deciduous shrub or small tree, reaching a height of 3–6 m.

External links

References 

gilgiana
Flora of Eastern Asia